The cabildo of San Juan Tenochtitlan was a governing council established in the 16th century to give a Spanish-style government to Tenochtitlan.

The cabildo consisted of a single governor, a number of alcaldes and regidores, and a number of other minor officials.

Governor

Initially the governorship was given to the tlatoani (indigenous dynastic ruler) and many early governors were thus referred to by the Spaniards as cacique y gobernador ("Indian ruler and governor") or señor y gobernador ("lord and governor"). The last tlatoani of Tenochtitlan was Luis de Santa María Nanacacipactzin (1563–1565). Governors who also were tlatoani or cuauhtlatoani (interim ruler) are indicated in the list.

Subsequent (non-dynastic) governors were referred to juez-gobernador ("judge-governor") or simply gobernador ("governor"). In 1564, the governor received a salary of 400 pesos per year.
Cuauhtémoc (1521–1525; also tlatoani)
Juan Velázquez Tlacotzin (1525–1525/1526; also cuauhtlatoani)
Andrés de Tapia Motelchiuh (1526–1531; also cuauhtlatoani)
Pablo Xochiquentzin (1532–1536; also cuauhtlatoani)
Diego de Alvarado Huanitzin (1538–1541; also tlatoani)
Diego de San Francisco Tehuetzquititzin (1541–1554; also tlatoani)
Esteban de Guzmán Omacatzin (1554–1557; only as judge)
Cristóbal de Guzmán Cecetzin (1557–1562; also tlatoani)
Luis de Santa María Nanacacipactzin (1563–1565; also tlatoani)
Francisco Jiménez (1568–1569)
Antonio Valeriano (1573–1599)
Melchor de Mendoza (1593–1593)
Gerónimo López (1599–1608)
Juan Bautista (1609–1610)
Juan Pérez de Monterrey (1610–1614)
Francisco Bautista Valeriano (1616–1618)
Jerónimo de León (1619)
Antonio Valeriano “El Joven” (1620–1621)
Diego Carrillo (1622–1628)
Juan de León (1629–1633)
Cristóbal Pascual (1634–1639)
Martín González (1640–1647)
Manuel de Tapia Moctezuma (1648–1653)
Diego de la Cruz (1654-1654)
Juan de Aguilar (1654-1654)
Juan de Velasco (1654-1654)
Diego de la Cruz Villanueva (1655–1656)
Marcos de la Cruz (1657-1657)
Pedro Bernal (1657–1658)
Francisco Benítez Ynga (1659-1660)
Francisco Benítez (1660–1664)
Lorenzo de Santiago (1665–1666)
Felipe de Aguilera (1667–1668)
Felipe de Aguilar (1669–1674)
Mateo Salvador (1675-1675)
Juan de Aguilar (1675-1676)
Juan Bautista Valeriano (1676-1677)
Gregorio de los Reyes (1677)
Juan de Xara (1678–1681)
Matías de los Ángeles (1682)
Bernardino Antonio de la Cruz (1684)
Matías de la Cruz (1685)
José de la Cruz (1686)
 Bernardino Antonio de la Cruz (1687)
Matías de los Ángeles (1688)
 Bernardino Antonio de la Cruz (1688)

Alcaldes
New alcaldes were elected yearly. Until 1600, Tenochtitlan was served by two alcaldes. In odd-numbered years, the alcaldes would be representatives of the "barrios" of San Pablo Teopan and San Juan Moyotlan, while in even years, the alcaldes would be representatives of San Sebastián Atzaqualco and Santa María la Redonda Cuepopan. In 1600, the number of alcaldes was increased to four, one for each district; in 1610 it was increased again to eight, with two for each district.

In 1564, alcaldes were receiving salaries of 50 pesos.

Regidores
Tenochtitlan had twelve regidores, an unusually high number. Like alcaldes, regidores represented the four subdivisions of Tenochtitlan, although with disproportionate representation of San Juan Moyotlan.

In 1564, regidores were receiving salaries of 20 pesos.

Notes

References 
 

 
 

 
People of New Spain
1520 establishments in the Spanish Empire